Michalis Bellis (born 1 February 1940) is a Greek retired football defender and later manager.

References

1940 births
Living people
Greek footballers
Polykastro F.C. players
Iraklis Thessaloniki F.C. players
Panathinaikos F.C. players
Panachaiki F.C. players
PAOK FC players
Super League Greece players
Association football defenders
Greece international footballers
Greek football managers
Iraklis Thessaloniki F.C. managers
Rodos F.C. managers
Kavala F.C. managers
Makedonikos F.C. managers
PAOK FC managers
Apollon Pontou FC managers
Footballers from Thessaloniki